Ute Skorupski (born 6 January 1959) is a rower who represented East Germany.

Starting for SC DHfK Leipzig, Skorupski became world champion in the coxed four at the 1978 World Rowing Championships on Lake Karapiro in New Zealand with Kersten Neisser, Angelika Noack, Marita Sandig, and Kirsten Wenzel as coxswain. Skorupski won a silver medal in coxed four at the 1979 World Rowing Championships in Bled, Yugoslavia.

References 

1959 births
Living people
East German female rowers
Sportspeople from Leipzig
World Rowing Championships medalists for East Germany